Flyer (Jude Jackson) is a fictional character, a superhero appearing in American comic books published by Marvel Comics. The character appears in the NEW-GEN comic books. Created by Chris Matonti, J.D. Matonti, and Julia Coppola, he first appeared in NEW-GEN #1 (2010). He is a founding member of the A.P.N.G., and gained his powers when Deadalus released a nanobot plague on the world of New-Gen.

Fictional character biography

Early life
Jude was born in the utopian world of New-Gen, an environment in which almost every single aspect is controlled by nanotechnology. He was a small child when Deadalus, apprentice and colleague of the de facto ruler of New-Gen, went rogue and released an enormous quantity of biologically manipulative nanobots on the population. He was one of the children infected by the tiny robots, radically altering his physical form. He grew a pair of large, bat-like wings as a result of his infection. Gabriel took him in as a student and member of the A.P.N.G. as a means to ensure his safety and his ability to use his powers for good.

Training with A.P.N.G.
Flyer's education and training were administered by Gabriel and Thea, over the course of many years. In addition to classroom study of various academic fields, he often took part in large scale combat and tactical drills. He proved to be a hard worker, if a bit cocky and arrogant. Gazelle, his best friend and constant rival on the squad, consistently challenged him to contests of speed throughout their training and maturing, leaving him a fierce competitor.

Battle with Sly
Gabriel sent Flyer, along with the rest of the A.P.N.G., after Sly managed to dig his way through the crust of the underworld onto Zadaar IV with his large army of MetalMites and microbots. Flyer used his speed and maneuverability in the air to both dodge enemy fire and destroy several MetalMites from above. He even used his teammate Diamond as a sort of human shell on a particularly large MetalMite, dropping him from a great height and through the machine. Sly, in a last-ditch effort to destroy the A.P.N.G., shot the team with a nanobot killing laser, leaving them powerless and exhausted. Gabriel teleports to the battle and gave each member of the A.P.N.G. a nano-glove, containing nanobots which restore their powers and strength. As Gabriel fought Sly, Flyer regained his spirit, destroying several more MetalMites with his teammates, eventually winning the battle and returning home to New-Gen.

Powers, abilities, and equipment
Flyer possesses a pair of large bat-like wings that allow him to fly at extremely high speed. The wings are strong, but not invulnerable to injury. He was seen showing concern for their safety on more than one occasion during the battle between Sly and the A.P.N.G. The wings are strong enough to support at least one passenger in flight.

References

External links 
 https://web.archive.org/web/20110707153446/http://apngenterprises.com/comic/characters-of-new-gen/
 http://www.comicvine.com/flyer/29-74399/